Luis Ángel Cano Quintana (born 5 September 1999) is an Ecuadorian footballer who plays as an attacking midfielder for S.D. Aucas.

Career

Club career
Cano began his career at the local club Ciudad del Norte in Vinces. He made his debut for the clubs U-17 team in 2013 at the age of only 13. He played for the club until he moved to Fiorentina FC, also from his hometown Vinces, ahead of the 2017 season.

He then moved to Ecuadorian Serie B club CD Santa Rita later in 2017, where he made 73 appearances and scored six times over two seasons at the age of 17-18. Ahead of the 2019 season, Cano then joined Ecuadorian Serie A club Independiente del Valle. However, he only played for official games for the clubs reserve team in the Serie B, before leaving the club at the end of 2019.

Ahead of the 2020 season, Cano moved to Guayaquil City. He made 25 league appearances for the club and scored five goals. Ahead of the 2021 season, Cano joined fellow league club S.D. Aucas.

International career
During 2018, Cano was summoned to the Ecuador U-20 squad several times.

In August 2018, Cano was in the starting line up for the Ecuador national team in a friendly match against the Ecuador U-20 team.

References

External links
 

Living people
1999 births
Association football midfielders
Ecuadorian footballers
Ecuador youth international footballers
Ecuadorian Serie B players
Ecuadorian Serie A players
C.S.D. Independiente del Valle footballers
Guayaquil City F.C. footballers
S.D. Aucas footballers
People from Vinces Canton